Geodia conchilega is a species of sea sponge in the family Geodiidae. It is found in the Adriatic Sea.

References

Bibliography 
 Schmidt, O. (1862). Die Spongien des adriatischen Meeres. (Wilhelm Engelmann: Leipzig): i-viii, 1-88, pls 1-7. page(s): 51; pl IV fig 11

Tetractinellida
Sponges described in 1862